The Cheetah Girls is a 2003 American musical television film based on the book series of the same name by Deborah Gregory. This film marks the first Disney Channel Original Movie as a musical.

Plot
Four teen girls in ManhattanGalleria, Chanel, Aqua, and Dorindaperform at a children's birthday party as The Cheetah Girls. After the performance, Chanel rushes home to tell her mother about the show, but her mother is preoccupied preparing for a date with her new Parisian boyfriend. Galleria comes home to her parents, who chastise her for not taking phone messages for her mother or walking their Bichon Frise dog, Toto. Meanwhile, Dorinda attends to her job, doing janitorial work at a community center.

The girls hope to become the first freshmen to win the talent show in their school's history. After a successful audition for the talent show, a famous alumnus of the school, Jackal Johnson, expresses interest in signing The Cheetah Girls to his record label. Galleria introduces herself as the founder and songwriter of The Cheetah Girls, which is not appreciated by the group's other members. While Galleria's mother, Dorothea, is initially hesitant to let The Cheetah Girls pursue the opportunity with Jackal, she eventually allows the girls to have a meeting after being encouraged by Galleria's father.

The meeting is a success, and despite some ongoing concerns from Galleria, the girls begin to prepare to record their first song. Without asking the group's other members for opinions, Galleria suggests that The Cheetah Girls should not make time for the talent show due to their record deal, and criticizes Dorinda for repeatedly wearing the same dull clothing. Aqua encourages Chanel, Galleria's oldest friend, to speak to Galleria about her behavior. Meanwhile, Dorinda has the opportunity to take a dance audition at the center where she is employed. She is offered a paying role because of her work, but taking on the role would require her to leave the Cheetah Girls.

Later, Chanel becomes distressed after overhearing a voicemail suggesting that her mother was planning to sell their New York City apartment to move to Paris with her boyfriend. Feeling neglected, Chanel takes advantage of having her mother's credit card to go on a shopping spree on Madison Avenue. In an act of kindness, Chanel purchases a cheetah jacket for Dorinda who reveals her financial troubles: She is a poor foster child who lives in a 10-child household with a mother whose husband is a superintendent for the building. Chanel assures Dorinda that they will remain friends and she will always be a Cheetah Girl.

At the next meeting between The Cheetah Girls and Jackal Johnson, Jackal reveals that a marketing team has developed a new image for the group that will require them to wear masks and lip sync. Galleria is devastated by this and declares that the group refuse the offer, but the other girls stay behind due to their frustrations with Galleria's attitude. Galleria leaves under the impression that the other Cheetah Girls have taken the deal. Chanel arrives home where her mother reveals her credit card was declined due to Chanel's shopping spree. Chanel breaks down after thinking about how grateful she is for her mother given Dorinda's current status as a foster child, and Chanel's mother agrees to make more time for her daughter.

Later, Galleria's dog Toto falls into an obstruction on the Manhattan streets. This attracts a great deal of attention, including a live news story, which alerts the other Cheetah Girls members about what is going on and causes them to come to Toto's rescue. Their singing helps calm Toto down and allow for his safe removal from the obstruction. This act of bonding ultimately causes the girls to repair their friendship, and they go on to sing a new song on the news for all of New York to see. Jackal Johnson calls, voicing his regret trying to change The Cheetah Girls, but the girls refuse an offer with him. The Cheetah Girls end up winning the talent show, and the girls renew their commitment to achieving their dreams and maintaining their friendship.

Cast
 Raven-Symoné as Galleria "Bubbles" Garibaldi
 Adrienne Bailon as Chanel "Chuchie" Simmons
 Kiely Williams as Aquanette "Aqua" Walker
 Sabrina Bryan as Dorinda "Do" Thomas
 Lynn Whitfield as Dorothea Garibaldi, Galleria's mother
 Juan Chioran as Francobollo Garibaldi, Galleria's father
 Lori Anne Alter as Juanita Simmons, Chanel's mother
 Vince Corazza as Jackal Johnson, record producer and the film's antagonist
 Sandra Caldwell as Drinka Champane, the music teacher
 Kyle Schmid as Derek, Galleria's love interest and rapper of Sonic Chaos
 Kim Roberts as Mrs. Bosco, Dorinda's foster mom
 Caitlyn Williamson as Danielle Thomas, Dorinda's youngest sister
 Kyle Saunders as Pucci Simmons, Chanel's little brother
 Ennis Esmer as Rick, a comedian

Production
During casting auditions for the film, executives at Disney dropped the character Anginette Walker from the books, because couldn't find the right twin girls to play both her and Aqua. According to author Deborah Gregory, Tia and Tamera Mowry's names were brought up in the meeting, but were considered to be "too sophisticated" for the roles. The singer Solange Knowles was originally cast to play the role of Aqua. However, she pulled out of the film's production due to the promotion and release of her debut album Solo Star. The role was then given to Kiely Williams, who was in the girl group 3LW with Adrienne Bailon at the time. Jurnee Smollett also auditioned for the film at one point.

The film was directed by Oz Scott and produced by Whitney Houston, Debra Martin Chase and Co Producer Cheryl Hill. The script was written by Alison Taylor and the music was composed by John Van Tongeren and Mark Mothersbaugh. It was shot during October and November 2002 in Toronto, Ontario, Canada and Manhattan, New York City, New York.

Soundtrack

An original motion picture soundtrack containing songs from and inspired by the film was released on August 12, 2003, by Walt Disney Records and Columbia Records. The soundtrack went to #33 on the Billboard 200 and was certified Double Platinum.

Awards
 2004 – Nominated; Black Reel: Television Best Actress (Raven-Symoné)
 2004 – Nominated; Black Reel: Television Best Supporting Actress (Lynn Whitfield)
 2004 – Nominated; DGA Award for Outstanding Directorial Achievement in Children's Programs (Oz Scott)
 2004 – Nominated; Image Award for Outstanding Performance in a Youth/Children's Program (Lynn Whitfield)
 2012 – Nominated; Vision Award for Best Dramatic Performance (Lynn Whitfield)

Reception
The movie premiered with 6.5 million viewers. The DVD sold 800,000 copies.

Video games
 The Cheetah Girls was released in 2006 by Disney for Game Boy Advance.
 The Cheetah Girls: Pop Star Sensations was released in 2007 by Disney for Nintendo DS.
 The Cheetah Girls: Passport to Stardom was released in 2008 by Disney for Nintendo DS.

Film sequels

The Cheetah Girls 2
The Cheetah Girls 2 was released August 25, 2006.

The sequel follows the same main characters as the first film. They travel to Barcelona, Spain to compete in a musical performance competition and continue pursuing their dreams of pop superstardom. Its premiere received a total of over 8.1 million viewers.

The movie begins at a graduation party for the Manhattan Magnet's Class of 2006. While having a sleep-over at Galleria's apartment, Chanel tells the girls that her mother, Juanita, is planning a trip to Barcelona, where they will visit Juanita's long-term boyfriend. In an effort to spend summer together, the girls enter a music competition in Barcelona. Once there, a fellow competitor's mother conspires to break up The Cheetah Girls to increase her daughter's chances of winning. The whole film is shot in Barcelona, including the parts that took place in New York City.

The Cheetah Girls: One World
The third film in the series, The Cheetah Girls: One World, was released August 22, 2008. It premiered with 6.2 million viewers.

Chanel, Dorinda, and Aqua are cast in a musical film that will be shot in New Delhi, India. Once they arrive in the exotic city, the girls receive an  unpleasant surprise: the movie's director must choose only one of them. The announcement puts a strain on the girls' friendship. However, the happy ending has all three of them dancing in the film. This film was shot in Udaipur, India.

Raven-Symoné did not reprise her role as Galleria, resulting in her character attending college off-screen. Raven-Symoné passed on the film due to her negative experience during The Cheetah Girls 2. She has described her co-stars as having acted "clique-ish", and recalled feeling "excluded". Instead, she preferred to concentrate on her solo music career.

References

External links
 
 

2003 television films
2003 films
2003 comedy-drama films
2003 in American television
2000s buddy comedy-drama films
2000s female buddy films
2000s musical comedy-drama films
2000s teen comedy-drama films
American buddy comedy-drama films
American female buddy films
American musical comedy-drama films
American teen comedy-drama films
American teen musical films
The Cheetah Girls films
Comedy-drama television films
Films about girl groups
Films about orphans
Films based on American novels
Films based on young adult literature
Films directed by Oz Scott
Films set in New York City
Films shot in Toronto
Musical television films
2000s English-language films
2000s American films